Colegio público Rufino Blanco is a school in Madrid. The school is on C / General Alvarez de Castro 46.

The school has been bilingual since 2009. They trade to other countries such as the Netherlands. The English classes have assistants who come from the United States to help improve pronunciation and teach new words. The school is quite large, with a large dining hall, a gym inside, a stage for performances, a playground for toddlers and one for older children.

After finishing a grade there are school trips with activities including canoeing, climbing and horse riding.

Education in Madrid